Dejan Ilić (born 24 March 1976) is a Serbian former footballer who played as a midfielder.

Career
Ilić spent five and a half seasons with Red Star Belgrade over two spells between 1997 and 2004, winning three national championships (2000, 2001, and 2004) and three national cups (1999, 2000, and 2004).

In 2004, Ilić moved abroad to France and signed with Istres. He also played professionally in Slovenia (Gorica), Israel (Maccabi Tel Aviv), and Cyprus (AEK Larnaca).

Honours
Red Star Belgrade
 First League of Serbia and Montenegro: 1999–2000, 2000–01, 2003–04
 Serbia and Montenegro Cup: 1998–99, 1999–2000, 2003–04

References

External links
 
 

1976 births
Living people
Sportspeople from Leskovac
Serbia and Montenegro footballers
Serbian footballers
Association football midfielders
FK Zemun players
Red Star Belgrade footballers
FK Obilić players
FC Istres players
ND Gorica players
Maccabi Tel Aviv F.C. players
AEK Larnaca FC players
First League of Serbia and Montenegro players
Ligue 1 players
Slovenian PrvaLiga players
Israeli Premier League players
Cypriot First Division players
Serbia and Montenegro expatriate footballers
Serbian expatriate footballers
Expatriate footballers in France
Expatriate footballers in Slovenia
Expatriate footballers in Israel
Expatriate footballers in Cyprus
Serbia and Montenegro expatriate sportspeople in France
Serbian expatriate sportspeople in Slovenia
Serbian expatriate sportspeople in Israel
Serbian expatriate sportspeople in Cyprus